The One-Tonne Challenge was a challenge presented by the Government of Canada in March 2004 for Canadians to reduce their greenhouse gas emissions by one tonne each year. The figure represented 20% of total greenhouse gas output by Canadians at the time and aimed to help the country reach its Kyoto Protocol emission reduction targets. The Liberal Government under Jean Chrétien and Paul Martin approved over $45 million to fund the program from 2003 to 2006.

To promote this program, the government placed television and print ads featuring comedian Rick Mercer. In one commercial, he described Canadians as wanting to take the challenge. "C’mon... we’re Canadian... we’re up for a challenge!"

The government urged Canadians to do such things as:

 take public transit more often
 idle vehicles less
 use programmable thermostats
 seal windows with caulking and weather-stripping
 compost organic kitchen waste
 support green energy
 water and energy conservation
 purchase electronics that are labelled with Energy Star logo
 recycling

The program received a lukewarm reception from the public, and has been criticized as ineffective and wasteful.

This program was started by the Liberal Party of Canada. However, with the election of Stephen Harper's Conservative Government in 2006, the One Tonne Challenge was scrapped.

See also

 Air pollution
 Chlorofluorocarbons
 Recycling

References

External links
 Government of Canada - One-Tonne Challenge
  Yukon News - Conservatives Nix One Tonne Challenge

Environment of Canada
Greenhouse gas emissions
Emissions reduction
Energy conservation in Canada